Trixie Tagg (before van Lieshout, Amsterdam, December 13 1948) is a former Australian educator, former soccer player and former soccer coach. She was one of a number of coaches of the Australia women's national football team between 1979 and 1989. Netherlands-born Tagg was the coach of Australia women's national football team for its 1981 tour of New Zealand.

She was capped four times by the Matildas. All four caps came in the 1975 Asian Cup. This team is now recognised as the first Matilda’s’ team.

References

Living people
Date of birth missing (living people)
Australian soccer coaches
Australian people of Dutch descent
Australia women's national soccer team managers
1948 births